Ron Van T'Hag (born 6 July 1940) is a former  Australian rules footballer who played with Geelong in the Victorian Football League (VFL).

Originally from Almelo in the Netherlands, he emigrated to Australia with his parents at the age of 13.

Notes

External links 

Living people
1940 births
VFL/AFL players born outside Australia
Australian rules footballers from Victoria (Australia)
Geelong Football Club players
Dutch emigrants to Australia